Love in the Afternoon is a 1957 American romantic comedy film produced and directed by Billy Wilder, and starring Gary Cooper, Audrey Hepburn and Maurice Chevalier. The screenplay by Wilder and I.A.L. Diamond is based on the 1920 Claude Anet novel Ariane, jeune fille russe (Ariane, Young Russian Girl). The story explores the relationship between a notorious middle-aged American playboy business magnate and the 20-something daughter of a private detective hired to investigate him. The supporting cast features John McGiver and Lise Bourdin.

Plot
Young  cello student Ariane Chavasse eavesdrops on a conversation between her father, Claude Chavasse, a widowed private detective who specializes in tracking unfaithful spouses, and his client, "Monsieur X". After Claude gives his client proof of his wife's daily trysts with American business magnate Frank Flannagan in Room 14 at the Paris Ritz, Monsieur X announces he will shoot Flannagan later that evening. Claude is nonchalant, regretting only the business he will lose, since Flannagan is a well-known international playboy with a long history of casual affairs. When Ariane cannot get the Ritz to put her through to Flannagan on the phone, and the police decline to intervene until after a crime has been committed, she decides to warn him herself.

Ariane is in time. When Monsieur X breaks into Flannagan's hotel suite, he finds Flannagan with Ariane, not his wife, who is cautiously making her escape via an outside ledge. Flannagan is intrigued by the mysterious girl, who refuses to give him any information about herself, even her name. He starts guessing her name from the initial "A" on her purse, and when she declines to tell him he resorts to calling her "thin girl". She has no romantic history but pretends to be a femme fatale to interest him, and soon falls in love with the considerably older man. She agrees to meet him the next afternoon, withholding that she has orchestral practice in the evenings. She comes with mixed feelings, but spends the evening while waiting for him to leave for the airport.

Ariane's father, who has tried unsuccessfully to protect her from knowing about the tawdry domestic-surveillance details in his files, notices her change of mood but has no idea that it proceeds from one of his cases.

A year later, Flannagan returns to Paris and the Ritz. Ariane, who has kept track of Flannagan's womanizing exploits through the news media, meets him again when she sees him at an opera while surveying the crowd from a balcony. She puts herself in his path in the lobby, and they start seeing each other again. This time, when he persists in his questioning, she makes up a long list of prior imaginary lovers based on her father's files, later telling Flannagan that he is her 20th. Flannagan gradually goes from being amused to being jealously tormented by the possible comparisons, but is unsure whether they are real. When he encounters a still-apologetic Monsieur X, the latter recommends Claude to him, and thus Flannagan hires Ariane's own father to investigate.

It does not take Claude long to realize that the mystery woman is Ariane. He goes to the Ritz, tells Flannagan her first name, informs his client that the girl fabricated her love life, and eventually tells him that Ariane is his daughter. He tells Flannagan that she is a "little fish" that he should throw back, since she is serious and he wants to avoid serious relationships.

When Ariane comes to his hotel suite that afternoon Flannagan is hurriedly packing to leave Paris, pretending to be on his way to meet "two crazy Swedish twins" in Cannes. At the train station they both keep up their act of not caring deeply for each other, although Ariane sheds a few tears that she blames on the soot. As the train departs Ariane runs along the platform and tells Flannagan, who stands in the coach's door, that she will soon travel with her many lovers. Running faster and faster as the train speeds up, her femme-fatale facade cracks, she frantically repeats "I'll be all right, I'll be all right", and her love shows through. Flannagan changes his mind, sweeps her up in his arms onto the coach, and before kissing her calls her by her name, Ariane.

In  voice over, Claude informs us that the couple were married in Cannes and now live together in New York.

Cast

Music
Songs and music in the film include:

 "Fascination" by Fermo Dante Marchetti with lyrics (1905) by Maurice de Féraudy and English lyrics by Dick Manning; Performed by The Gypsies
 "C'est si bon" by Henri Betti; Lyrics by André Hornez; Performed by The Gypsies 
 "L'ame de Poètes" by Charles Trenet; Performed by The Gypsies 
 "Love in the Afternoon," "Ariane" and "Hot Paprika" by Matty Malneck

Production

Development
Love in the Afternoon was the first of twelve screenplays by Billy Wilder and I.A.L. Diamond, who met when Wilder contacted Diamond after reading an article he had written for the Screen Writers Guild monthly magazine. The two men immediately hit it off, and Wilder suggested they collaborate on a project based on a German language film he had co-written in the early 1930s. The script was based on the 1920 Claude Anet novel Ariane, jeune fille russe (Ariane, Young Russian Girl), which had been filmed as Scampolo (1928) and Scampolo, a Child of the Street (1932), the latter with a script co-written by Wilder. Wilder was inspired by a 1931 German adaptation of the novel, Ariane, directed by Paul Czinner.

Casting

Wilder's first choices for Frank Flannagan were Cary Grant and Yul Brynner. "It was a disappointment to me that [Grant] never said yes to any picture I offered him," Wilder later recalled. "He didn't explain why. He had very strong ideas about what parts he wanted". The director decided to cast Gary Cooper because they shared similar tastes and interests and Wilder knew the actor would be good company during location filming in Paris. "They talked about food and wine and clothes and art", according to co-star Audrey Hepburn, Wilder's only choice for Ariane.

Talent agent Paul Kohner suggested Maurice Chevalier for the role of Claude Chavasse, and when asked if he was interested, the actor replied, "I would give the secret recipe for my grandmother's bouillabaisse to be in a Billy Wilder picture". Love in the Afternoon marked Chevalier's first non-singing role in a film since 1947. The film was also the American feature film debut of character actor John McGiver.

Filming
It was Wilder's insistence to shoot the film on location in Paris. Outdoor locations included the Château of Vitry in the Yvelines; the Palais Garnier, home of the Paris Opera; and the Hôtel Ritz Paris. Interior scenes were filmed at the Studios de Boulogne. However, Cooper was reportedly uncomfortable in this, his first filming location outside the United States. To cover over Cooper's performance and also to obscure "the lines and age in Cooper's face", Wilder photographed the actor's face in shadow and with "gauzy filters"; the camera was also often positioned behind Cooper's back.

For the American release of the film, Chevalier recorded an end-of-film narration letting audiences know Ariane and Flannagan had married and were living in New York City. Although Wilder objected to the addition, he was forced to include it to forestall complaints that the relationship between the two was immoral.

Music
Music plays an important role in the film. A four-piece band of musicians called "The Gypsies" entertains Flannagan and his various lovers in his hotel suite, since Frank says he's "not much of a talker" and lets music create the romance. The Gypsies stick with Flannagan through thick and thin, serenading him as he drowns his sorrows in drink while listening to Ariane's recording of her long list of lovers, joining him in a Turkish bath, and following him to the train station.

Much of the prelude to the 1865 Richard Wagner opera Tristan und Isolde is heard during a lengthy sequence set in the Palais Garnier opera house, possibly conducted by Hans Knappertsbusch. Matty Malneck, Wilder's friend from their Paul Whiteman days in Vienna, wrote three songs for the film, including the title tune. Also heard are "C'est si bon" by Henri Betti, "L'ame Des Poètes" by Charles Trenet, and "Fascination", a 1932 song based on a European waltz, which is hummed repeatedly by Ariane.

Malneck later wrote lyrics for "Fascination" and "Hot Paprika". "Fascination" became a popular hit for Chevalier and for many other singers; "C'est si bon" was also recorded by numerous singers and became an international hit.

Jonhy Mercer later wrote lyrics for "Love in the Afternoon". The song became a hit for Jerry Vale and other singers.

Release

Produced at a cost of $2.1 million, the film was plagued by underfinancing. The debt Allied Artists incurred while making Friendly Persuasion prompted the studio to sell the distribution rights of Love in the Afternoon for Europe to gain more financing.

The film had its world premiere in Paris on May 29, 1957. It opened in Los Angeles on June 19, 1957, and in New York on August 23, 1957.

Box-office
The film was a commercial failure in the United States. It did not resonate with American audiences in part because Cooper looked too old to be having an affair with Hepburn's young character. Wilder himself admitted: "It was a flop. Why? Because I got Coop the week he suddenly got old". Allied Artists re-released the film in 1961 under the new title Fascination. However, in Europe, the film was a major success, released under the title Ariane.

Reception
In his 1957 review, Bosley Crowther of The New York Times called the film a "grandly sophisticated romance ... in the great Lubitsch tradition" and added, "Like most of Lubitsch's chefs-d'oeuvre [masterpieces], it is a gossamer sort of thing, so far as a literary story and a substantial moral are concerned ... Mr. Wilder employs a distinctive style of subtle sophisticated slapstick to give the fizz to his brand of champagne ... Both the performers are up to it—archly, cryptically, beautifully. They are even up to a sentimental ending that is full of the mellowness of afternoon."

Wilder is often mentioned as Lubitsch's disciple. In his 2007 essay on the two directors for Stop Smiling magazine, Jonathan Rosenbaum wrote that Love in the Afternoon was "the most obvious and explicit and also, arguably, the clunkiest of his tributes to Lubitsch, partially inspired by Lubitsch's 1938 Bluebeard's Eighth Wife (which Wilder and [Charles] Brackett also helped to script, and which also starred Gary Cooper, again playing a womanizing American millionaire in France)". John Fawell wrote in 2008 that "Lubitsch was at his most imaginative when he lingered outside of doorways, particularly when something promiscuous was going on behind the door, a habit his pupil Billy Wilder picked up. In Wilder's most Lubitsch-like film, Love in the Afternoon, we know when Gary Cooper's rich playboy has bedded another conquest when we see the group of gypsy musicians (that travels with Cooper to aid in his wooing) tiptoe out of the hotel room, shoes in hand."

In an undated and unsigned review, TV Guide observes that the film has "the winsome charm of Hepburn, the elfin puckishness of Chevalier, a literate script by Wilder and Diamond, and an airy feeling that wafted the audience along," but felt it was let down by Gary Cooper, who "was pushing 56 at the time and looking too long in the tooth to be playing opposite the gamine Hepburn ... With little competition from the wooden Cooper, the picture is stolen by Chevalier's bravura turn".

Channel 4 stated: "the film as a whole is rather let down by the implausible chemistry that is meant to develop between Cooper and Hepburn."

In her film analysis, Marilyn Throne calls the script an exposure of the myth of "the girl-virgin as the seductress of the worldly and successful American male". Throne notes that the character of Ariane is surrounded by men—including her father—who all affirm and support the prerogative of men to philander and flirt, while women are expected to remain chaste. The sexual double standard is seen for what it is when Ariane's father confronts Flannagan and both realize their wrong, as the detective-father who has made his wealth from investigating this playboy now realizes the playboy has seduced his own daughter, and the playboy who has mocked and eluded cuckolded husbands comes face to face with the father of the girl he seduced. Flannagan's decision at the end to scoop up Ariane into the moving train, and later marry her, puts an unrealistic romantic stamp on the story, considering Flannagan's long philandering past and Ariane's total inexperience with men and money. Throne concludes, "One rather wishes he'd adopted the girl instead of marrying her".

Accolades
Screenwriters Wilder and Diamond won the award for "Best American Comedy" at the 1957 Writers Guild of America Awards.

Wilder was nominated for Outstanding Directing – Feature Film by the Directors Guild of America.

See also
 List of American films of 1957

References

Sources

External links

 
 
 
 

American romantic comedy films
1957 romantic comedy films
1957 films
Films directed by Billy Wilder
American black-and-white films
Allied Artists films
American remakes of German films
Films set in Paris
Films based on French novels
Films based on romance novels
Films with screenplays by Billy Wilder
Films with screenplays by I. A. L. Diamond
United Artists films
1950s English-language films
1950s American films